Duke of Gloucester and Edinburgh was a British title (after Gloucester and Edinburgh) in the Peerage of Great Britain; the sole creation carried with it the subsidiary title of Earl of Connaught.

It existed for the brother of King George III, Prince William Henry; there had been Dukedoms of Gloucester and of Edinburgh but their extinction gave the opportunity for combination.

The dukedom of Gloucester and Edinburgh was a royal dukedom when the duke was entitled to the style "His Royal Highness", as Prince William Henry was, but Prince William Frederick was only granted this style on his marriage in 1816.

Dukes of Gloucester and Edinburgh
After the Union of Great Britain, the Hanoverian kings liked to grant double titles (one from one constituent country, one from another) to emphasise unity.

| Prince William HenryHouse of Hanover1764–1805also: Earl of Connaught
| 
| 25 November 1743Leicester Houseson of Frederick, Prince of Wales and Princess Augusta of Saxe-Gotha
| Maria Walpole17663 children
| 25 August 1805Gloucester Houseaged 61

|-
| Prince William FrederickHouse of Hanover1805–1834also: Earl of Connaught
| 
| 15 January 1776Teodoli Palaceson of Prince William Henry and Maria Walpole
| Princess Mary of the United Kingdom(his first cousin)1816no children
| 30 November 1834Bagshot Parkaged 58

|}
Prince William Frederick  had no children and all his titles became extinct on his death.

Family tree

See also
 Duke of Gloucester
 Duke of Edinburgh
 List of dukedoms by reign
 Earl of Gloucester

References

 
Extinct dukedoms in the Peerage of Great Britain
Noble titles created in 1764
1764 establishments in Great Britain